Freire is a Chilean town and commune in Cautín Province, Araucanía Region.

The town of Freire lies at the junction of Chile Highway 5 and the Route CH-199, which links Freire with Villarrica and Pucón.

Demographics
According to the 2002 census of Population and Housing by the National Statistics Institute (Instituto Nacional de Estadísticas or INE) Freire had 25,514 inhabitants; of these, 7,629 (29.9%) lived in urban areas and 17,885 (70.1%) in rural areas. At that time, there were 13,143 men and 12,371 women. The population grew by 10.9% (2,517 persons) between the 1992 and 2002 censuses.

Administration
As a commune, Freire is a third-level administrative division of Chile administered by a municipal council, headed by an alcalde who is directly elected every four years. The 2008-2012 alcalde is Luis Armando Arias Lopez, and the council has the following members:
 Luis García Friz
 Luis Marchant Morales
 Sebastian Daniel Rojas Rivera
 Yanina Barría Rojas
 Patricio Ríos González
 José Oñate Orias

Within the electoral divisions of Chile, Freire is represented in the Chamber of Deputies as a part of the 51st electoral district (together with Carahue, Nueva Imperial, Saavedra, Teodoro Schmidt, Pitrufquén, Cholchol). The commune is represented in the Senate as part of the 15th senatorial constituency (Araucanía-South).

References

External links
   Municipality of Freire 

Communes of Chile
Populated places in Cautín Province
1895 establishments in Chile